On February 17, 2023, a spree shooting occurred in Arkabutla, Mississippi, United States. Six people were killed, and one person was injured. The suspect, 52-year-old Richard Dale Crum, was later arrested and charged with first-degree murder.

Shootings 
At approximately 11:00 a.m. on February 17, 2023, the perpetrator pulled into the parking lot of a convenience store and shot into the car adjacent to him, killing a man. The victim had no connection to the attacker. There was also another person in the vehicle, but that individual was left unharmed. The suspect then drove to the house of his ex-wife, and shot her to death. He also struck her fiancé with a gun but did not shoot him. The shooter proceeded to drive to the residence behind the house, where he fatally shot his stepfather and stepfather’s sister. After, the perpetrator fatally shot two men on a road behind Crum's house. The two victims were identified as his stepfather’s cousin and also a family friend there to help repair the roof.

A sheriff's deputy saw a car matching the description of the suspect's car. After attempting to pull over the car failed, the deputy followed the vehicle until it stopped in a driveway of the suspect's home. There, the deputy arrested Crum as he attempted to leave the scene on foot.

Victims 
Six people were killed, three of whom had a connection to the accused.

They were identified as:
 Chris Boyce, 59
 Debra Crum, 60
 Charles Manuel, 76
 George McCain, 73
 Lynda McCain, 78
 John Rorie, 59

Suspect 
The suspect was identified as 52-year-old former Illinois resident Richard Dale Crum (born January 1970), who was a resident of neighboring Coldwater at the time of the killings. Crum was born and raised in Rock Falls, Illinois, and lived in various other towns in the state throughout parts of his life. A family friend told CBS News that Crum had a history of mental illness.

See also 

 List of mass shootings in the United States in 2023

References 

2023 in Mississippi
2023 active shooter incidents in the United States
February 2023 crimes in the United States
Deaths by firearm in Mississippi
Spree shootings in the United States
Tate County, Mississippi